Cupira (population 24,173) is a city in northeastern Brazil, in the State of Pernambuco. It lies in the mesoregion of Agreste of Pernambuco and has 105.92 sq/km of total area.

Geography
 State - Pernambuco
 Region - Agreste of Pernambuco
 Boundaries - Agrestina, Altinho and São Joaquim do Monte (N); Lagoa dos Gatos (S); Belém de Maria (E); Panelas (W).
 Area - 105.92 km2
 Elevation - 416 m
 Hydrography - Una river
 Vegetation - Subcaducifólia forest
 Annual average temperature - 23.4 c
 Distance to Recife - 170.5 km

Economy
The main economic activities in Cupira are commerce and agribusiness, especially farming of cattle, goats, sheep, pigs; and plantations of sweet potatoes, beans and manioc.

Economic indicators

Economy by sector
2006

Health indicators

References

Municipalities in Pernambuco